Jerry Zucker (born 1950) is an American film director/producer

Jerry Zucker also may refer to:
 Jerry Zucker (businessman) (1949–2008), Israeli-born American businessman